Roman Aleksandrovich Konstantinov (born August 15, 1983 in Belovo, Kemerovo Oblast) is a Russian weightlifter. He won the bronze medal for the 94 kg class at the 2006 World Weightlifting Championships in Santo Domingo, Dominican Republic, and eventually claimed his first ever career title at the 2007 World Weightlifting Championships in Chiang Mai, Thailand, with a total of 397 kg. He also added a silver medal to his collection from the 2007 European Weightlifting Championships in Strasbourg, France.

Konstantinov represented Russia at the 2008 Summer Olympics in Beijing, where he competed for the men's middle heavyweight category (94 kg), against several top-class weightlifters, including his teammate Khadzhimurat Akkayev, Kazakhstan's Ilya Ilin, and three-time Olympians Nizami Pashayev of Azerbaijan and Szymon Kołecki of Poland. Konstantinov placed eighth in this event, as he successfully lifted 175 kg in the single-motion snatch, and hoisted 212 kg in the two-part, shoulder-to-overhead clean and jerk, for a total of 387 kg.

References

External links
Profile – Lift Up
NBC 2008 Olympics profile

Russian male weightlifters
1983 births
Living people
Olympic weightlifters of Russia
Weightlifters at the 2008 Summer Olympics
People from Belovo, Kemerovo Oblast
European Weightlifting Championships medalists
World Weightlifting Championships medalists
Sportspeople from Kemerovo Oblast